Lake Charles station is a train station in Lake Charles, Louisiana, United States. It is served tri-weekly by Amtrak's Sunset Limited. It is located on 100 Ryan Street at the west end of South Railroad Avenue. Lake Charles station is a decorative and unstaffed waiting room that serves as a replacement for the original Lake Charles Station once located on South Railroad Avenue between Bilbo and Hodges Streets. The iron brackets supporting the station's roof were salvaged from the original Southern Pacific passenger station which served as the Amtrak station.

References

External links 

Lake Charles station – USA Rail Guide (TrainWeb)

Amtrak stations in Louisiana
Buildings and structures in Lake Charles, Louisiana